The 1932 San Diego State Aztecs football team represented San Diego State Teachers College as a member of the Southern California Conference (SCC) during the 1932 NCAA football season. Led by third-year head coach Walter Herreid, the Aztecs compiled an overall record of 3–5–1 with a mark of in conference play, placing sixth in the SCC. The team outscored its opponents 80–72 points for the season. San Diego State played home games at Balboa Stadium in San Diego.

Schedule

Notes

References

San Diego State
San Diego State Aztecs football seasons
San Diego State Aztecs football